High Valley AVA is an American Viticultural Area (AVA) located in the eastern part of Lake County, California. The cool marine breezes are consistently sifting into the valley, keeping the valley cooler than the other appellations in Lake County. Red volcanic soils can be found on the hillsides while alluvial fans and benches on the valley floor provide well-drained beds for the vines. Red Bordeaux varietals and Syrah can be found planted along warmer ridges, while the cooler valley floor contains Pinot grigio, Pinot noir, Chardonnay, Riesling and Sauvignon blanc.

Geography 
Most are relatively new, but within the area are some of the oldest vines in California. There are 15 struggling Zinfandel and Muscat vines planted by the Ogulin family, which brought them from Slovenia around 1875. Since Slovenia borders Croatia, where cousins of Zinfandel vines are found, this suggests significance in the history of California Zinfandel. The old vines shouldn't be a surprise, for before Prohibition, Lake County was producing reputable wines before the vineyards were replaced with other crops.

References 

American Viticultural Areas
American Viticultural Areas of California
Geography of Lake County, California
2005 establishments in California